An umbrella title is a formal or informal name connecting a number of individual items with a common theme. It is most often used in lieu of listing the separate components or providing a convenient "label" for a collection of disciplines.

Uses of umbrella titles

Academia
Nonspecific fields of study are identified by umbrella titles such as "physics", "physical education", and "medicine" to distinguish them from specialized fields of study such as exercise physiology.

Scientific conferences and discussions
Many scientific and academic conferences use umbrella titles as unifying themes for the activities scheduled in the course of the conference.

Employment
Umbrella titles in common use involve either general job descriptions of a group of workers with similar responsibilities (like "teacher") or rank (military or nonmilitary).

Politics and law
Collections of organizations with a common legal or legislative interest are often "united" under an umbrella title for the purposes of lobbying or participating in a lawsuit.

Entertainment and literature
Umbrella titles are widely used in music, literature, television, and theater. Uses of umbrella titles vary widely in the arts, to a much greater spectrum of use than in other fields of study.

Music and dance
Umbrella titles are used to demarcate the music field into general trends or styles: classical music, jazz, rock music, hip hop, rhythm and blues and other labels which each cover more specialized musical styles. A similar "structure" can be found in the field of dance.

Prior to the sale of the long playing record in 1950, albums containing several 78 revolutions-per-minute records were often sold under umbrella titles (a collection of recordings from Oklahoma, for example).  It can be argued that titles of all long-playing records and compact discs are "umbrella" titles—and several such recordings with a common theme often have an umbrella title (such as Chip Davis' "Day Parts" series) as well.

Television
While it can be argued that every title of a televised series, especially those primarily used to designate a time period rather than actual programming (like NBC Monday Night at the Movies) is an umbrella, the term is more appropriately applied to names of anthology series, series that combine together to provide a common theme (such as the three components of 90 Bristol Court), wheel series, and other series under a common heading (such as Crimetime After Primetime and Four in One).

While it was common practice in the 1950s and early 1960s for series to alternate or otherwise share a time slot in American broadcast network television (for example, The Jack Benny Show shared a time slot with, first Private Secretary and then The George Gobel Show), umbrella titles were not used by United States' networks until 1964, when NBC presented three half-hour programs on Monday nights as a programming block centered at a southern California apartment complex, 90 Bristol Court.

While the 1964 programming experiment did not succeed (two of the series were cancelled; the third lasted the broadcast season but was not renewed for the 1965-1966 season), NBC was not dissuaded from further programming experimentation. Within a decade, the network then experimented with wheel series, first with Four in One and The Bold Ones, then with NBC Mystery Movie.  Afterwards additional wheel series were presented by American broadcast networks, to varying degrees of success. The experiment was revived in 1979 with Cliffhangers.

In the United Kingdom, umbrella titles were used in varying degrees in their programming as well. The long-running Doctor Who used umbrella titles on several levels, first with individual named episodes under the umbrella of the title of an overall story (the first four episodes were commonly called "An Unearthly Child" even though none of them actually showed it to be the title of the story); even after the naming of individual episodes ceased, umbrella titles were often used to collect stories with a common enemy or theme (Daleks stories, Cybermen stories, UNIT stories, and season-long "Key to Time" and "Trial of a Time Lord").

Motion pictures and literature
The use of umbrella titles in motion pictures parallels their use in literature. Movie trilogies such as Lord of the Rings and the Three Colors trilogy (a.k.a. "Red, White, and Blue trilogy") commonly are called by umbrella titles, as was the case for their literary cousins (such as John Dos Passos' U.S.A.).  Umbrella titles were often used to cover longer sequences of motion pictures or novels (such as the James Bond and Star Wars films and Marcel Proust's multi-volume Remembrance of Things Past). Often umbrella titles are used to collect motion pictures with common stars ("Marx Brothers movies") or common characters ("Dirty Harry movies"), as is the case for novels or comics ("Perry Mason novels", for example). In literature, sometimes an umbrella title is used for a collection of stories with a common locality, such as the Wessex novels of Thomas Hardy.

References

Television terminology
Literature

de:Umbrella title